The Cape Government Railways 5th Class 4-6-0 of 1891 was a South African steam locomotive from the pre-Union era in the Cape of Good Hope.

In 1891, the Cape Government Railways placed a second batch of thirty  tender locomotives with a 4-6-0 Tenwheeler type wheel arrangement in mainline service on all three Cape Systems. They were similar to the previous batch of 1890, but differed in respect of the diameter of their coupled wheels, the length of their smokeboxes and their tractive effort.

Manufacturer

The second batch of Cape Government Railways (CGR) 5th Class  Tenwheeler type tender locomotives was delivered from Dübs and Company in 1891.

Of the thirty locomotives, four went to the Eastern System to work out of East London, numbered in the range from 55 to 58, nine went to the Midland System to work out of Port Elizabeth, numbered in the ranges from 136 to 138 and 309 to 314, and seventeen went to the Western System for service between Touws River and Beaufort West, numbered 117, 118 and in the range from 121 to 135.

The order had originally been for 36 locomotives. In 1891, a complete design for a new 7th Class  Mastodon type locomotive was prepared at the Salt River works in Cape Town. The last six locomotives of the order were cancelled and substituted with an order for six of these new 7th Class locomotives.

Characteristics
While the 1891 locomotive was identical to the batch of 1890 in most respects, it differed in three aspects.
 It had a longer smokebox. On the 1890 locomotive, the chimney was so close to the front of the smokebox that the headlight had to be mounted on a platform attached to the front of the smokebox, while on the 1891 locomotive there was sufficient space ahead of the chimney to mount the huge headlight on top of the smokebox.

In the 1890s, some improvements to smokebox design took place. Extending the smokebox forward increased its volume. The increased amount of exhaust gases present in the smokebox had the effect of stabilising and improving the draught. The date of this improvement can be pinned to the introduction of this second batch of 5th Class locomotives with their lengthened smokeboxes. This had such a profound effect on the boiler’s steaming ability that virtually every serving locomotive on the CGR and Natal Government Railways (NGR) had their smokeboxes extended.

Service

Cape Government Railways
The 5th Class was considered to be the first really efficient all-round locomotive in the Cape of Good Hope. It was used on all kinds of traffic, wherever the mainline had severe gradients and curves.

At least one of the Western System’s locomotives, no. 134, was modified by the CGR by having the smokebox extended even further forward to almost flush with the buffer beam. The reason for this modification is not known, but it was possibly done to make room for a spark arrester, as was done with the 4th Class 4-6-0TT of 1880 on the Eastern system.

Oranje-Vrijstaat Gouwerment-Spoorwegen
In late 1896, ten of these locomotives, six from the Midland System and four from the Western System, were sold to the newly established Oranje-Vrijstaat Gouwerment-Spoorwegen (OVGS) of the Orange Free State. On the OVGS, they were designated 5th Class K and renumbered in the range from 49 to 58.

New Cape Central Railway
The New Cape Central Railway (NCCR) was a private railway company which, by 1894, operated a branchline from Worcester via Robertson and Roodewal to Swellendam. In 1897, the Midland System's engine no. 136 was sold to the NCCR, where it was renumbered to no. 8.

Central South African Railways
During the Second Boer War, control of all railways in the Orange Free State and Transvaal was taken over by the Imperial Military Railways. At the end of the war in 1902, the ten ex-OVGS locomotives came onto the roster of the Central South African Railways (CSAR), where they were renumbered in the ranges from 315 to 317 and 326 to 332.

In 1904, the CSAR reboilered three of these locomotives, no. 327, 328 and 329, with larger boilers with Belpaire fireboxes which were equipped with Drummond tubes. This involved the installation of cross-water tubes into the firebox, as featured on the London and South Western Railway's  and L11 Class, in an attempt to increase the heating surface area of the water, albeit at the cost of increased boiler complexity. Visible external evidence of the presence of Drummond tubes was the rectangular inspection covers which were attached to the sides of the firebox, just ahead of the cab.

Since by then, however, these locomotives were being withdrawn from mainline traffic, no more such reboilerings were carried out.

South African Railways
When the Union of South Africa was established on 31 May 1910, the three Colonial government railways (CGR, NGR and Central South African Railways) were united under a single administration to control and administer the railways, ports and harbours of the Union. Although the South African Railways and Harbours came into existence in 1910, the actual classification and renumbering of all the rolling stock of the three constituent railways was only implemented with effect from 1 January 1912.

By 1912, twenty-five of these locomotives survived, nineteen on the CGR and six, including the three which had been reboilered, on the CSAR. They were considered obsolete by the South African Railways (SAR), designated Class 05 and renumbered by having the numeral "0" prefixed to their existing numbers.

During 1914, at the outbreak of the First World War, military planners followed the example set by the British invading forces during the Second Boer War and identified a requirement for armoured trains. For this purpose, five Class 05 locomotives were specially protected with armour plate and named Trafalgar, Scot, Erin, Karoo and Schrikmaker. The armour-plating was fitted by the workshops in Pretoria, Bloemfontein and Salt River. Their engine numbers are not known, nor whether they were from this Class or the Class 05 of 1890, or both.

In spite of being considered obsolete, some of the Class 05 locomotives survived as shunting engines in SAR service for another four decades, with some even getting reboilered while in SAR service. One confirmed example is no. 0138, which was still equipped with boiler no. 4825 of 1922 when it was withdrawn from service in 1953.

When they were eventually withdrawn from service in 1953, they were the last obsolete locomotives to be still in service.

Works numbers
By 1896, all the locomotives of the Eastern System and one of the Midland System had been renumbered. The works numbers, CGR System, original numbers, renumbering and distribution of the Cape 5th Class of 1891 are listed in the table.

Illustration

References

0380
0380
4-6-0 locomotives
2′C n2 locomotives
Dübs locomotives
Cape gauge railway locomotives
Railway locomotives introduced in 1891
1891 in South Africa
Scrapped locomotives